Etienne Siliee (often misspelled as Etienne Sealey) is a Curaçao professional football manager. In 1996 and from 2005 to 2007 he coached Netherlands Antilles national football team. Currently he working as a technical director of the Curaçao Football Federation.

He was placed in charge of the Curaçao national football team for their 2014 Caribbean Cup campaign. He is also a coaching license instructor for CONCACAF.

References 

Year of birth missing (living people)
Living people
People from Willemstad
Curaçao football managers
Dutch Antillean football managers
Netherlands Antilles national football team managers
Curaçao national football team managers